Myke Michel de Carvalho (born October 28, 1983 in Belém do Pará) is a Brazilian retired amateur boxer, best known for his participation in the 2004, 2008 and 2012 Summer Olympics and for winning bronze medals at the Panamerican Games in 2007 and 2011.

Career
Carvalho stems from a boxing family, his uncle Dalgírio was a professional boxer. He started working out at the age of 11 and had his first amateur bout at 15.

He won silver at the South American Games 2002 at featherweight losing to Nehomar Cermeno.

He qualified for the 2004 Summer Olympics  by ending up in first place at the 2nd AIBA American 2004 Olympic Qualifying Tournament in Rio de Janeiro, Brazil. At age 21 Carvalho lost at the Olympics 2004 in the men's lightweight division to Alex de Jesús of Puerto Rico, 24:39.

Now at junior welter he won the 2006 South American Games.

At the PanAm Games 2007 he lost at junior welter 8:9 to eventual winner Karl Dargan in the semis and settled for bronze.

At his 2008 Olympic qualifier he lost his semifinal to Manuel Félix Díaz but edged out Gumersindo Carrasco in the all-important third-place bout 3:2 to qualify. At the Olympics he was upset by Mauritian Richarno Colin, see here.

He won a gold at the 2010 South American Games at Junior Welter, and a bronze at the 2011 Military World Games.

At the 2011 Pan American Games he competed at Welter and won another Bronze after losing to Carlos Banteux.

At the 2012 American Boxing Olympic Qualification Tournament he beat Oscar Molina and qualified for his third Olympics in 2012, where he lost to Errol Spence.

Carvalho wished to achieve a fourth Olympic appearance at the 2016 Summer Olympics in Rio de Janeiro, but a forearm injury one month before the qualifiers forced his retirement at the age of 33. He now takes care of a gym at his hometown of Belém.

References

External links
 Brazilian Boxing Confederation profile

1983 births
Living people
Sportspeople from Belém
Brazilian male boxers
Super-featherweight boxers
Lightweight boxers
Light-welterweight boxers
Olympic boxers of Brazil
Boxers at the 2004 Summer Olympics
Boxers at the 2008 Summer Olympics
Boxers at the 2012 Summer Olympics
Pan American Games bronze medalists for Brazil
Pan American Games medalists in boxing
Boxers at the 2007 Pan American Games
Boxers at the 2011 Pan American Games
South American Games gold medalists for Brazil
South American Games silver medalists for Brazil
South American Games medalists in boxing
Competitors at the 2002 South American Games
Competitors at the 2006 South American Games
Competitors at the 2010 South American Games
Medalists at the 2007 Pan American Games
Medalists at the 2011 Pan American Games
21st-century Brazilian people
20th-century Brazilian people